Pierus, in Greek mythology, is a name attributed to two individuals:

Pierus, the eponym of Pieria, son of Makednos and father of the Pierides.
Pierus, son of Thessalian Magnes and father of Hyacinth. ,possible lover of Clio, muse of history.

Notes

References 
 Antoninus Liberalis, The Metamorphoses of Antoninus Liberalis translated by Francis Celoria (Routledge 1992). Online version at the Topos Text Project.
Apollodorus, The Library with an English Translation by Sir James George Frazer, F.B.A., F.R.S. in 2 Volumes, Cambridge, MA, Harvard University Press; London, William Heinemann Ltd. 1921. ISBN 0-674-99135-4. Online version at the Perseus Digital Library. Greek text available from the same website.
Pierre Grimal, The Dictionary of Classical Mythology
 William Smith. A Dictionary of Greek and Roman biography and mythology. London (1873).

Characters in Greek mythology